AS Monaco won Division 1 season 1987-88 of the French Association Football League with 52 points.

Participating teams

 Auxerre
 Bordeaux
 Stade Brest
 AS Cannes
 Stade Lavallois
 Le Havre AC
 RC Lens
 Lille
 Olympique Marseille
 FC Metz
 AS Monaco
 Montpellier La Paillade SC
 FC Nantes Atlantique
 OGC Nice
 Chamois Niortais
 Matra Racing
 Paris Saint-Germain FC
 AS Saint-Etienne
 Sporting Toulon Var
 Toulouse FC

League table

Promoted from Division 2, who will play in Division 1 season 1988/1989
 RC Strasbourg:Champion of Division 2, winner of Division 2 group B
 FC Sochaux-Montbéliard:Runner-up, winner of Division 2 group A
 SM Caen:Third place, winner of barrages against Chamois Niortais

Results

Relegation play-offs

|}

Top goalscorers

References

 Division 1 season 1987-1988 at pari-et-gagne.com

Ligue 1 seasons
France
1